The Canton of Heuchin is a former canton situated in the department of the Pas-de-Calais and in the Nord-Pas-de-Calais region of northern France. It was disbanded following the French canton reorganisation which came into effect in March 2015. It consisted of 32 communes, which joined the canton of Saint-Pol-sur-Ternoise in 2015. It had a total of 11,001 inhabitants (2012).

Geography 
The canton is organised around Heuchin in the arrondissement of Arras. The altitude varies from 42m (Tilly-Capelle) to 196 m (Fiefs) for n average altitude of 111m.

The canton of Heuchin included the following communes:

 Anvin 
 Aumerval 
 Bailleul-lès-Pernes 
 Bergueneuse 
 Bours 
 Boyaval 
 Conteville-en-Ternois 
 Eps 
 Équirre
 Érin 
 Fiefs 
 Fleury 
 Floringhem 
 Fontaine-lès-Boulans
 Fontaine-lès-Hermans 
 Hestrus 
 Heuchin 
 Huclier 
 Lisbourg 
 Marest 
 Monchy-Cayeux 
 Nédon 
 Nédonchel
 Pernes 
 Prédefin 
 Pressy 
 Sachin 
 Sains-lès-Pernes
 Tangry 
 Teneur 
 Tilly-Capelle 
 Valhuon

History

See also
Cantons of Pas-de-Calais 
Communes of Pas-de-Calais 
Arrondissements of the Pas-de-Calais department

References

Heuchin
2015 disestablishments in France
States and territories disestablished in 2015